Todos los hombres sois iguales is a Spanish comedy television series that originally aired on Telecinco from 23 September 1996 to 27 December 1998. Starring Josema Yuste, Tito Valverde and Luis Fernando Alvés, it consisted of the adaptation of the eponymous 1994 film to a television format.

Premise 
The fiction tracks the vicissitudes of three divorced men living in the same apartment and seeking for the attention of the cleaner.

Cast

Production and release 
The series was created by Joaquín Oristrell and it consisted of the adaptation of the eponymous 1994 film. It was produced by BocaBoca. Spanning across 5 seasons and 66 episodes, the original broadcasting run lasted from 23 September 1996 to 27 December 1998. The format was sold in Italy, spawning a remake titled Tutti gli uomini sono uguali.

References 

1996 Spanish television series debuts
1998 Spanish television series endings
1990s Spanish comedy television series
Telecinco network series
Television series by BocaBoca
Live action television shows based on films